Forrest Silva "Woody" Tucker (June 23, 1920 – May 29, 2004) was an American career criminal first imprisoned at age 15 who spent the rest of his life in and out of jail. He is best known as an escape artist, having escaped from prison "18 times successfully and 12 times unsuccessfully", by his own reckoning. The 2018 film The Old Man & the Gun, starring Robert Redford as Tucker, is based on his life.

Early life
Forrest Silva Tucker was born June 23, 1920, in Miami, Florida, to Leroy Morgan Tucker (1890–1938) and Carmen Tucker (née Silva; 1898–1964). Leroy Tucker, a heavy-equipment operator, left the family when Forrest was six years old. Forrest was raised in Stuart, Florida by his grandmother Ellen Silva (née Morgan). His first escape from detention happened in the spring of 1936, after he was incarcerated for car theft.

Personal life
Tucker married three times and had two children, a boy and a girl; none of his wives knew of his criminal career until they were informed by police.

Prison escapes 
A former inmate of Alcatraz Federal Penitentiary, Tucker  was able to escape from the authorities when he was temporarily moved to a hospital in San Francisco for an operation. He was captured a few hours later still in handcuffs and a hospital gown. His most famous escape was in the summer of 1979 from San Quentin State Prison in California, when he and two confederates built a kayak and paddled away in full view of the guards. He was not apprehended for four years, during which time he and a gang went on a crime spree. 

Tucker's crimes of choice were bank robberies. Law enforcement estimates Tucker stole over $4 million from banks during his career. Tucker wrote a number of books about his life, including Alcatraz: The True Story, and The Can Opener, although it is unclear if they were ever published.

While living in a retirement community in Pompano Beach, Florida, at the age of 79 and married for the third time, Tucker by himself robbed an estimated four banks in the local community. In 2000, law enforcement apprehended Tucker; the Court sentenced him to 13 years in prison at the Federal Medical Center, Fort Worth (now known as Federal Correctional Institution, Fort Worth).

In 2003, David Grann in The New Yorker profiled Tucker in a piece titled "The Old Man and the Gun", which described Tucker's most recent bank robbery. Tucker did not live out his sentence; he died in prison on May 29, 2004 at the age of 83.

Film 

In 2010, a film version of Tucker's life, The Old Man & the Gun was optioned by Anthony Mastromauro of Identity Films. It had previously been in development at Warner Bros. Pictures. Robert Redford starred in and produced the film, while David Lowery wrote and directed it. The film was released on September 28, 2018. Redford announced his intent to retire from acting after the film.

Notes

External links
David Grann. "The Old Man and the Gun" (abstract), The New Yorker, January 27, 2003
Mike Geary. "79 Years Old and His Life of Crime Appears to Be Going Strong", LA Times, July 27, 1999

1920 births
2004 deaths
American bank robbers
American escapees
American people who died in prison custody
Escapees from California detention
Escapees from United States federal government detention
Escapes and escape attempts from Alcatraz
Fugitives
Inmates of Alcatraz Federal Penitentiary
People from Miami
Prisoners and detainees of California
Prisoners who died in United States federal government detention
San Quentin State Prison